Buletin iNews is an Indonesian flagship news programme which broadcast on GTV, replacing Buletin Indonesia from 2012 to 2017. The program broadcast for three to four hours each day through Buletin iNews Pagi (breakfast news), Buletin iNews Siang (lunchtime news), Buletin iNews Malam (late night news), Kilas iNews (headline news), and Breaking iNews (breaking news, different coverage with iNews).

See also 
Seputar iNews
Lintas iNews

References 

Indonesian television news shows
Indonesian-language television shows
2017 Indonesian television series debuts
2010s Indonesian television series
2017 establishments in Indonesia
GTV (Indonesian TV network) original programming